William Lamartine Thompson (November 7, 1847 – September 20, 1909) was a noted American composer. He founded the W. L. Thompson Music Company and tried his hand with some success at secular compositions before finding his forte in hymns and gospel songs.

Education, family, community
Thompson was born November 7, 1847, in East Liverpool, Ohio, the youngest son of seven children of Josiah Thompson, who was a successful merchant, manufacturer, and banker, and a two-term member of the Ohio state legislature. His mother, Sarah Jackman Thompson, was devoted to social and charitable work.

Thompson graduated from Mount Union College in Alliance, Ohio, in 1870. In 1873, he attended the New England Conservatory of Music and later continued his musical studies in Leipzig, Germany.

Thompson married Elizabeth Johnson. They had a son, William Leland Thompson (born 1895), who was known by his middle name. The Thompsons built a large hilltop mansion on Park Boulevard in East Liverpool. The house still stands and is known locally as "the Softly and Tenderly House" (see "Hymns and gospel songs" infra).

Thompson took a strong interest in local history, and paid for a large stone and tablet to mark the spot where Confederate General John Hunt Morgan and his raiders were captured near Lisbon, Ohio. Thompson donated large tracts of land to East Liverpool for public parks, stipulating that no alcohol would be permitted there.

Secular career
Thompson began composing in his teens and in addition to hymns, wrote the popular songs "My Home on the Old Ohio" and "Gathering Shells from the Seashore."

Both a lyricist and composer, Thompson ensured he would always remember words or melodies that came to him at odd times.  He said, "No matter where I am, at home or hotel, at the store or traveling, if an idea or theme comes to me that I deem worthy of a song, I jot it down in verse. In this way I never lose it."

Rebuffed in an early attempt to sell his songs to a commercial publisher, Thompson eventually opened the W. L. Thompson Music Company in East Liverpool. By the 1880s, it was one of the most prominent and successful such businesses in the United States. Thousands of music teachers and musicians ordered sheet music, instruments, and other supplies from Thompson's store. Thompson later founded a music and publishing company in Chicago.

Hymns and gospel songs
A member of the Church of Christ, Thompson is best known as the writer and composer of hymns and gospel songs, to which he increasingly devoted his talents after his teenage years.

His most well known work is the classic and enduring gospel song "Softly and Tenderly Jesus Is Calling" which has been translated into countless languages. It has been featured in the films The Trip to Bountiful, Junebug, and A Prairie Home Companion (sung by Meryl Streep and Lily Tomlin), in the Anne Tyler novel The Accidental Tourist, and the television series True Blood. Other popular gospel songs by Thompson which continue in use, particularly in the Churches of Christ, Southern Baptist and the Church of Jesus Christ of Latter-day Saints, are "Put Your Shoulder to the Wheel" - "Lead Me Gently Home, Father" (1879), "There's a Great Day Coming" (1887), "Jesus Is All the World to Me" (1904), "Have I Done Any Good in the World Today?", and "The World Has Need of Willing Men".

Final illness and death
Thompson fell ill during a tour of Europe, and his family cut short their travels to return home.  He died a few weeks later in New York City on September 20, 1909.

Legacy
"Softly and Tenderly Jesus Is Calling" was sung by the choir of Atlanta's Ebenezer Baptist Church at the funeral for Dr. Martin Luther King, Jr. and is used widely today as an invitation hymn in evangelistic services.  The famous evangelist Dwight L. Moody greatly admired Thompson's music and used "Softly and Tenderly in many of his evangelistic rallies in America and Britain.  When Moody lay dying, after all visitation had stopped, Thompson called on him.  He was refused until Moody learned it was Thompson.  Then he insisted on seeing the songwriter.  Moody is said to have encouraged Thompson by saying, "Will, I would rather have written 'Softly and Tenderly' than anything I have been able to do in my whole life."  Moody died shortly afterwards while singing the words of that hymn.  Cynthia Clawson's interpretation of the song is used as background throughout the 1985 movie Trip to Bountiful.

See also
 Christian music
 Hymn
 Music publishing

References

External links
 Will Thompson, 2002 inductee, the Lou Holtz/Upper Ohio Valley hall of Fame in East Liverpool, Ohio
 Thompson Park in East Liverpool, donated to the city by Will Thompson
 
 

1847 births
1909 deaths
American male composers
American members of the Churches of Christ
American community activists
New England Conservatory alumni
Ohio Prohibitionists
People from East Liverpool, Ohio
University of Mount Union alumni
19th-century American composers
Activists from Ohio
19th-century American male musicians